The Indispensability of Mathematics is a 2001 book by Mark Colyvan in which he examines the Quine–Putnam indispensability argument in the philosophy of mathematics. This thesis is based on the premise that mathematical entities are placed on the same ontological foundation as other theoretical entities indispensable to our best scientific theories.

References

External links 
 The Indispensability of Mathematics

2001 non-fiction books
Oxford University Press books
Books about philosophy of mathematics